Stephen Manson (born 25 February 1986, in Edinburgh) is a former Scottish born professional footballer.

He previously played for Falkirk, Berwick Rangers (on loan), Raith Rovers and Sligo Rovers in the League of Ireland.
  
He left Raith Rovers in January 2007.

Stephen now plays for Scottish junior club Linlithgow Rose in the Scottish East Super-League.

Stephens goal in the Junior Scottish Cup for Linlithgow Rose V Lochee Utd (semi final second leg) was voted goal of the season by The Sun newspaper in 2009/10 season.

External links 

1986 births
Living people
Footballers from Edinburgh
Scottish footballers
Scottish expatriate footballers
Expatriate association footballers in the Republic of Ireland
League of Ireland players
Scottish Football League players
Hibernian F.C. players
Falkirk F.C. players
Berwick Rangers F.C. players
Raith Rovers F.C. players
Forfar Athletic F.C. players
Sligo Rovers F.C. players
Linlithgow Rose F.C. players
Association football midfielders